The 1942 European Amateur Boxing Championships were held in Breslau, Germany from 20 to 25 January. There were 97 fighters from 11 countries participating: Germany, Hungary, and Italy (16 boxers in each squad), and Croatia, Denmark, Finland, Netherlands, Slovakia, Spain, Sweden, Switzerland. After World War II, the results were annulled by AIBA.

Medal winners

Medal table

References

External links
European Championships
Kontrowersje: Wojenne Mistrzostwa Europy - Breslau 1942

European Amateur Boxing Championships
Boxing
European Amateur Boxing Championships
International boxing competitions hosted by Germany
Sport in Wrocław